Estérel is a city in Les Pays-d'en-Haut Regional County Municipality in the Laurentides region of Quebec, Canada. The municipal territory almost entirely extends around Lake Masson, whereas the village itself is situated on the eastern shore of this lake.

History
The area of Estérel was first part of the Parish Municipality of Sainte-Marguerite-du-Lac-Masson, which formed in the early 1860s.

Around 1920, Baron Louis Empain, son of Belgian industrialist Baron Édouard Empain, acquired substantially all the land around Lake Masson intending to build a resort called Estérel, named after the Esterel massif in Provence, south-east France. In 1939, the Estérel Post Office opened.

In 1958, Fridolin Simard, an industrialist from Abitibi, bought over 2000 hectares of the baron's estate and completed the holiday resort. A year later in 1959, The Town of Estérel was formed when it separated from Sainte-Marguerite-du-Lac-Masson.

On October 10, 2001, the Town of Estérel and the Parish Municipality of Sainte-Marguerite-du-Lac-Masson were merged to become the Town of Sainte-Marguerite–Estérel. On January 1, 2006, after a municipal referendum, the Town of Estérel was however re-established and the Town of Sainte-Marguerite–Estérel was renamed to its former name of Sainte-Marguerite-du-Lac-Masson.

Demographics 

Population trend:
 Population in 2021: 262 (2016 to 2021 population change: 33.7%)
 Population in 2016: 196 
 Population in 2011: 199 
 Population in 2006: 256
 2001 to 2006 population change: 41.4%
 Population in 2001: 181
 Population in 1996: 108
 Population in 1991: 119

Mother tongue:
 English as first language: 17%
 French as first language: 75.5%
 English and French as first language: 3.8%
 Other as first language: 5.7%

Education

Sir Wilfrid Laurier School Board operates English-language public schools:
 Saint Adèle Elementary School in Saint-Adèle

See also
List of cities in Quebec

References

External links

Incorporated places in Laurentides
Cities and towns in Quebec